José Carlos Silva Franco (born 29 July 1995) known as Júnior, is a Portuguese footballer who plays for Vilafranquense, as a midfielder.

External links

1995 births
Living people
Footballers from Lisbon
Portuguese footballers
Association football midfielders
Liga Portugal 2 players
Vitória S.C. players
Vitória S.C. B players
AD Oliveirense players
F.C. Felgueiras 1932 players
Juventude de Pedras Salgadas players
G.D. Gafanha players
F.C. Famalicão players
AD Fafe players
C.D. Mafra players
F.C. Penafiel players
U.D. Vilafranquense players